Adrian Dante Ursea (born 14 September 1967) is a Romanian professional football manager and former player. He was most recently the manager of Ligue 1 club OGC Nice.

Early life 
Born in Slobozia, Ursea completed his schooling in Ploiești.

Playing career 
Ursea played 102 games for the Romanian top flight side Petrolul Ploiești, and also played for various clubs in Switzerland.

Coaching career 
After his retirement, Ursea went into coaching, and for four years was technical director at Swiss side Neuchâtel Xamax. On 4 December 2020, he became the manager of OGC Nice after Patrick Vieira was dismissed. He left Nice by the end of the 2020–21 season.

Managerial statistics

References

1967 births
Living people
People from Slobozia
Romanian footballers
Association football midfielders
Romania under-21 international footballers
Liga I players
Swiss Challenge League players
FC Petrolul Ploiești players
FC Rapid București players
FC Locarno players
CS Chênois players
Étoile Carouge FC players
FC Bulle players
FC Stade Nyonnais players
FC Fribourg players
Romanian football managers
Ligue 1 managers
Servette FC managers
Neuchâtel Xamax FCS non-playing staff
OGC Nice managers
Romanian expatriate footballers
Romanian expatriate football managers
Romanian expatriate sportspeople in Switzerland
Expatriate footballers in Switzerland
Expatriate football managers in Switzerland
Romanian expatriate sportspeople in France
Expatriate footballers in France